Space Is Still the Place is the second full-length album by The Bright Light Social Hour. It was released on March 10, 2015 via Frenchkiss Records (worldwide) and MapleMusic Recordings (Canada).

Concept
The band has stated the album was largely inspired by staying with fans while touring in the Southern United States, as well as by concepts of Afrofuturism and progressivism.

In an interview with The Huffington Post, O'Brien stated, “We became really interested in mixing southern aspects of music -- soul, rock, blues, those sort of things -- with a progressive outlook, where we got really into dance music, house music, techno, psychedelic rock. We became really interested in mixing all those sounds; something future-looking and also vibe-y and comfortable, but different all together.” 

The album title is inspired by Sun Ra's 1974 film Space Is the Place.

Recording and release
The album was recorded between June 2013, and January 2014, at the band's home in Austin, Texas. It was mixed by the band and Chris Coady in New York, NY in May 2014.

On January 20, 2015 the band announced via The Huffington Post Space Is Still The Place would be released March 10, 2015 on Frenchkiss Records.

On February 17, 2015, Jay Z's Life+Times premiered the music video for their first single, "Infinite Cities", directed by bassist/singer Jack O'Brien.

Songs from Space Is Still the Place have been featured in HBO's Vice Principals, MTV's Teen Wolf, Fox's Brooklyn Nine-Nine, The CW's Riverdale, NBC's Midnight, Texas, Audience's Kingdom, USA's Shooter, Hulu's Shut Eye, Terrence Malick's 2017 film Song to Song, Ubisoft's Far Cry 5 and a Nintendo Switch commercial.

Reception

Space Is Still the Place was released to critical acclaim, described by AllMusic's Mark Deming as "an ambitious and wildly entertaining journey into the minds of the men who created it" and "a smart, fearless work from a band whose inner journey is paying impressive musical dividends."

Track listing

Personnel 
The personnel of Space Is Still the Place according to the liner notes of the album's LP release:
 Jack O'Brien – bass, vocals, Roland Juno-60
 Curtis Roush – guitar, vocals, Minimoog Voyager, Roland Juno-60, Wurlitzer
 Joseph Mirasole – drums, Dave Smith Tempest, Elektron Analog Four, Minimoog Voyager

Technical personnel:
 Joseph Mirasole, Curtis Roush, Jack O'Brien - production, engineering
 Chris Coady - mixing engineer
 Greg Calbi - mastering
 Mariano Peccinetti - artwork

References 

2015 albums